USCGC Cactus (WLB-270) is a  seagoing buoy tender (WLB). A Cactus-class vessel, she was built by Marine Ironworks and Shipbuilding Corporation in Duluth, Minnesota. Cactuss preliminary design was completed by the United States Lighthouse Service and the final design was produced by Marine Iron and Shipbuilding Corporation in Duluth. On 31 March 1941 the keel was laid, she was launched on 25 November 1941 and commissioned on 1 September 1942. The original cost for the hull and machinery was $782,381.

Cactus is one of 39 original 180-foot seagoing buoy tenders built between 1942 and 1944. All but one of the original tenders, were built in Duluth.

Cactus was decommissioned in 1971 after running aground.  Ultimately, the Coast Guard sold the damaged vessel and she was converted to a barge for use in the Pacific Northwest.  Cactus was moored without permission in Tacoma, Washington for several years and then in King County off Maury Island from 2003 to 2008. King County seized the vessel in 2008 and is (as of 2013) dismantling the vessel as funds allow.

Ship's history 

USCGC Cactus was initially assigned to the First Coast Guard District in 1942 and stationed at Boston, MA. On 12 June 1943 the tender collided with MV Manasquan and sustained considerable damage. After World War II Cactus continued to serve the First District from Boston, MA. In addition to tending aids to navigation (ATON), the cutter also performed search and rescue (SAR), icebreaking and law enforcement (LE) duties.

On 2 March 1952 Cactus provided assistance to FV Dorothy and FV Mary 20 miles south of Nantucket, MA. On 16 November 1953 Cactus fought a fire on FV Jane and FV Patricia. On 26 August 1954 Cactus assisted FV Western Pride which had grounded near Provincetown, MA. In 1957 Cactus assisted the grounded MV Franco Lisi near Salem, MA. On 10 February and 27 July 1957 Cactus fought pier fires in Boston, MA and moved a 450-foot Norwegian merchant vessel to safety away from the flames. During the night of 21–22 February 1959 Cactus assisted FV Jo-Ann.

At some point in the early 1960s CGC Cactus was retasked as an oceanographic buoy tender (WLBO-270), and was one of two WLBO's in Boston functioning as an oceanographic platform, painted white, instead of the usual black color denoting a USCG work vessel.  The other white WLBO vessel was the CGC Evergreen in Boston.

During 24 to 25 January 1966 she escorted the disabled merchant vessel, MS South African Victory to Boston.  On 4 February 1969 Cactus towed the disabled FV Chrisway to safety from 140 miles southeast of Cape Henry, VA.

In 1967, the CGC Cactus homeport was changed from Boston, MA to Bristol, RI.

In Nov/Dec 1969 the ship sailed from Bristol, RI, with a delivery Prize Crew, to her new homeport at Tongue Point Coast Guard Base in Astoria, OR in December 1969.  The entire CGC Cactus crew flew from Seattle to Boston for reassignment in CCDONE.
 
In 1971 Cactus wrecked on the submerged portion of South Jetty at Grays Harbor, WA. Both cargo holds were ruptured and tidal; her engine room was holed and taking on water. Her main engines were inoperative because of shaft misalignment and a damaged screw. Cactus was severely damaged and in peril of capsizing. She was successfully re-floated using air and towed to Seattle, WA by MS Salvage Chief, (Captain Reino Mattila, homeport Astoria, OR)
 
She was decommissioned in 1971.

References

External links

Cactus-class seagoing buoy tenders
1941 ships
Historic American Engineering Record in Oregon
Ships built in Duluth, Minnesota